Prasat Ta Krabey or Prasat Ta Krabei, in Khmer and also known as Prasat Ta Khwai, in Thai, is a disputed Khmer temple which was built during Angkor period, the golden age of Cambodian history. This 11th century religious site was constructed in order to be dedicated to Hindu god Shiva and has become a tourist attraction site near Cambodian-Thai border in recent years.

Etymology 
Prasat Ta Krabey literally means Grandfather Buffalo temple. Prasat is a Khmer word, derived from Sanskrit word (prāsāda), means temple. Ta means grandfather and the word Krabey means buffalo.

Plan and features 
Ta Krabey temple consists of a single central sanctuary, where houses a Shiva Linga, named Svayabhuva Linga, which means the self-emergence Linga and four gopuras face to all four directions in total area of 900 square meters. This sandstone temple was decorated with some carvings, especially the depiction of god Yama mounts on a buffalo as his vehicle, however the construction work of the temple was unfinished as most of the exterior surface of the central tower has no carving. According to architectural style, this temple was built in 12th or 13th century in Bayon style but it is believed that it started being constructed in 11th century. Nowadays, the temple is surrounded by Dângrêk Mountains jungle that provides cool shade and fresh air for visitors.

Location 
The temple is located on Dangrek mountain range, basically on Cambodian-Thai border, 57 km west of Samraong city which is the capital of Oddar Meanchey province and 13 km away from another Angkorian ancient temple, Prasat Ta Muen Thom. Tourists can travel from Samraong city along the national road 56 and a mountainous concrete road that leads to this ancient site.

Cambodian claimed that this temple is situated in Chher Slap village, Kouk Khpos commune, Banteay Ampil district, Oddar Meanchey province, Cambodia. On the Thai side, its location falls within Phanom Dong Rak District of Surin Province. Ownership of the temple has been subject to the Cambodian–Thai border dispute, and military clashes near the temple occurred in 2008 and 2011.

See also 
 Prasat Ta Muen Thom

References

Archaeological sites in Cambodia
Khmer Empire
Hindu temples in Cambodia
Angkorian sites in Thailand